Boleszkowice  is a village in Myślibórz County, West Pomeranian Voivodeship, in north-western Poland, close to the German border. It is the seat of the gmina (administrative district) called Gmina Boleszkowice.

The village has a population of 1,316.

References

External links

 Jewish Community in Boleszkowice on Virtual Shtetl

Villages in Myślibórz County